"I'll Always Come Back" is a song written and recorded by American country music artist K. T. Oslin.  It was released in January 1988 as the fourth single from the album 80's Ladies.  The song was Oslin's second number one on the country chart.  The single went to number one for one week and spent a total of thirteen weeks on the country chart.

Charts

Weekly charts

Year-end charts

References

K. T. Oslin songs
1988 singles
Song recordings produced by Harold Shedd
RCA Records Nashville singles
Songs written by K. T. Oslin
Music videos directed by John Lloyd Miller
1987 songs